Joannes Mattaeus Caryophyllis (1566–1633) was a Roman Catholic prelate who served as Titular Archbishop of Iconium (1622–1633).

Biography
Joannes Mattaeus Caryophyllis was born in La Canée in 1566.
On 8 August 1622, he was appointed during the papacy of Pope Gregory XV as Titular Archbishop of Iconium.
On 18 September 1622, he was consecrated bishop by Francesco Sacrati (cardinal), Bishop of Cesena, with Sebastiano Poggi, Bishop Emeritus of Ripatransone, and Girolamo Tantucci, Bishop of Grosseto, serving as co-consecrators. 
He served as Titular Archbishop of Iconium until his death on 23 May 1633.

Episcopal succession
While bishop, he was the principal co-consecrator of:

References

Sources
 (for Chronology of Bishops)
 (for Chronology of Bishops)

17th-century Roman Catholic titular bishops
Bishops appointed by Pope Gregory XV
1566 births
1633 deaths